A brickworks, also known as a brick factory, is a factory for the manufacturing of bricks, from clay or shale. Usually a brickworks is located on a clay bedrock (the most common material from which bricks are made), often with a quarry for clay on site. In earlier times bricks were made at brickfields, which would be returned to agricultural use after the clay layer was exhausted.

Equipment

Most brickworks have some or all of the following:
A kiln, for firing, or 'burning' the bricks.
Drying yard or shed, for drying bricks before firing.
A building or buildings for manufacturing the bricks.
A quarry for clay.
A pugmill or clay preparation plant (see below).

Brick making

Bricks were originally made by hand, and that practice continues in developing countries and with a few specialty suppliers.
Large industrial brickworks supply clay from a quarry, moving it by conveyor belt or truck/lorry to the main factory, although it may be stockpiled outside before entering the machinery. When the clay enters the preparation plant (Clay Prep) it is crushed, and mixed with water and other additives which may include breeze, a very fine anthracite that aids firing.
This process, also known as pugmilling, improves the consistency, firing qualities, texture, and colour of the brick. From here, the processed clay can either be extruded into a continuous strip and cut with wires, or be put into  moulds or presses (also referred to as forming) to form the clay into its final shape. 
After the forming or cutting, the bricks must be dried - in the open air, in drying sheds, or in special drying kilns.  The dried bricks must then be fired or "burnt" in a kiln, to give them their final hardness and appearance.

In the mid-nineteenth century the development of automated brickmaking machines such as the Bradley & Craven Ltd "Stiff-Plastic Brickmaking Machine" revolutionised the brick-manufacturing process.

 one of the largest single brickworks site in the world able to manufacture one million bricks per day stands on the banks of the Swan River in Perth in Western Australia.

Environmental effects
Zigzag brick kilns are recommended over traditional brick kilns because they consume less coal.

Historical notes
In the past, clay was often transported from the quarry to the brickworks by narrow gauge railway or aerial ropeway.

Notable brickworks
 The London Brick Company
 Bursledon Brickworks
Brickworks Limited - Australian brick manufacturer
Evergreen Brickworks

See also

Brickfield
Masonry
Program on Energy Efficiency in Artisanal Brick Kilns in Latin America to Mitigate Climate Change

References

 
.
Molding processes
Manufacturing plants
Bricks
Firing techniques